Derman may refer to:
 Cyrus Derman (1925-2011), American mathematician
 Emanuel Derman (born 1946), South African financial mathematician
 Derman (monastery), an Orthodox monastery affiliated with Ostroh Academy
 Derman (film), a 2008 Turkish-language film featuring Cengiz Küçükayvaz
 Derman, Iran, a village in Markazi Province, Iran